August Dresbach (13 November 1894 – 4 October 1968) was a German politician of the Christian Democratic Union (CDU) and former member of the German Bundestag.

Life 
Dresbach was a member of the state parliament of North Rhine-Westphalia from 1946 to 1947. He had been a member of the German Bundestag since the first election in 1949 to 1965, where he represented the Oberbergischer Kreis constituency as a member of parliament who was always directly elected. From December 1950 to October 1951, he was deputy chairman of the Bundestag Committee for Internal Administration Affairs.

Literature

References

1894 births
1968 deaths
Members of the Bundestag for North Rhine-Westphalia
Members of the Bundestag 1961–1965
Members of the Bundestag 1957–1961
Members of the Bundestag 1953–1957
Members of the Bundestag 1949–1953
Members of the Bundestag for the Christian Democratic Union of Germany
Members of the Landtag of North Rhine-Westphalia